Valdilene dos Santos Silva (born 18 December 1991) is a Brazilian long-distance runner. In 2019, she competed in the women's marathon at the 2019 World Athletics Championships held in Doha, Qatar. She finished in 30th place.

In 2017, she competed in the women's half marathon at the 2017 Summer Universiade held in Taipei, Taiwan.

In 2019, she competed in the women's marathon at the 2019 Pan American Games held in Lima, Peru. She finished in 6th place. In 2020, she competed in the women's half marathon at the 2020 World Athletics Half Marathon Championships held in Gdynia, Poland.

References

External links 
 

Living people
1991 births
Place of birth missing (living people)
Brazilian female long-distance runners
Brazilian female marathon runners
World Athletics Championships athletes for Brazil
Athletes (track and field) at the 2019 Pan American Games
Pan American Games athletes for Brazil
Competitors at the 2017 Summer Universiade
20th-century Brazilian women
21st-century Brazilian women